This following list of Canadian bioethics undergraduate and graduate programs was developed by the Canadian Task-force of the Association of Bioethics Program Directors in March 2017, based on a 2012 list developed by the Canadian Bioethics Society.

References

Postgraduate schools
Bioethics